KMVS (89.3 FM) is a non-commercial radio station owned by Educational Media Foundation in Moss Beach, California. It's branded as "K-Love".

The station started on August 30, 2010. First, it played a classic rock format, later it evolved in 2012 into an adult hits format playing music from the 1980s-now.

On June 12, 2015, KARC changed their call letters to KRSA and shifted its format to adult contemporary, branded as "Relax 103.3".

It can be heard in Pacifica, Moss Beach, San Francisco Sunset District, Daly City, Colma, Burlingame, Brisbane, San Bruno, Millbrae, San Mateo, South San Francisco, and Half Moon Bay.

On October 23, 2017, KRSA changed their format to Christian Contemporary, branded as K-Love. Effective December 11, 2017, Educational Media Foundation acquired the station from Educational Public Radio, Inc., at a purchase price of $25,000. The station changed its call sign to KMVS on December 22, 2017.

Previous logo

References

External links
Official Site
KLOVE purchases KRSA-FM to Expand San Francisco Presence

MVS (FM)
MVS (FM)
Radio stations established in 2006
2006 establishments in California
Contemporary Christian radio stations in the United States
K-Love radio stations
Educational Media Foundation radio stations